Crotch Hill is a summit in Hancock County, Maine, in the United States.

References

Mountains of Hancock County, Maine